The 2005–06 Calgary Flames season was the team's 26th season in the National Hockey League (NHL) in Calgary while the team celebrated its 25th season of play.

During the off-season following the 2004–05 NHL lockout, Flames general manager Darryl Sutter announced that he would not re-sign free agent Martin Gelinas for the 2005–06 season. Instead, Sutter brought in three ageing veterans, Bryan Marchment, Tony Amonte and Darren McCarty, as free agent reclamation projects to start the season. Nonetheless, the season began with high expectations following Calgary's surprising run to the 2004 Stanley Cup Finals.

The season opened with a disappointing October, as the Flames started 4–7–2 before an eight-game November winning streak propelled Calgary back into contention in the Northwest Division. The Flames would battle the Colorado Avalanche down the stretch, ultimately finishing eight points ahead of both Colorado and the Edmonton Oilers to capture the team's sixth division crown in franchise history.

However, during the playoffs, Calgary was eliminated by the Mighty Ducks of Anaheim in the first round in seven games.

Star goaltender Miikka Kiprusoff led the NHL in shutouts and goals against average while setting a franchise record for wins with 42. His exploits would win him the Vezina Trophy and William M. Jennings Trophy, along with being named a First Team All-Star. Kiprusoff was also a finalist for the Hart Memorial Trophy.

Rookie phenom Dion Phaneuf earned a nomination for the Calder Memorial Trophy after his 20-goal campaign set a franchise record for goals by a rookie defenceman, and fell just three shy of Brian Leetch's NHL record of 23 set in 1988–89.

The Flames sold out all 45 home games in 2005–06 as 19,289 fans packed the Pengrowth Saddledome for every regular season and playoff game played in Calgary.

At the 2006 Winter Olympics, three Flames players represented their countries: Jarome Iginla and Robyn Regehr represented Canada, while Jordan Leopold represented the United States. Kiprusoff had also been named to the Finnish team, but declined to participate due to an injury.

Regular season
The Flames finished first in the NHL in shutouts for with 10 and allowed the fewest goals in the NHL with 193 (excluding shootout goals allowed).

Season standings

Playoffs
The Flames entered the playoffs as the Northwest Division champions, and the third seed in the Western Conference.  They met the Mighty Ducks of Anaheim in the first round in a hard fought seven game series.  The goaltending of Ilya Bryzgalov would prove the turning point in the series after he replaced the ineffective starter Jean-Sebastien Giguere after game 3 and would stonewall the Flames for the rest of the series.

Schedule and results

Regular season

|- align="center" bgcolor="#ffbbbb" 
| 1 || October 5 || Calgary || 3 – 6 || Minnesota || || Kiprusoff || 19,398 || 0–1–0 || 0 || 
|- align="center" bgcolor="#bbffbb" 
| 2 || October 7 || Calgary || 3 – 1 || Columbus || || Kiprusoff || 18,136 || 1–1–0 || 2 || 
|- align="center" bgcolor="#ffbbbb" 
| 3 || October 9 || Calgary || 3 – 6 || Detroit || || Kiprusoff || 20,066 || 1–2–0 || 2 || 
|- align="center" bgcolor="#ffbbbb" 
| 4 || October 10 || Calgary || 3 – 7 || Colorado || || Kiprusoff || 18,007 || 1–3–0 || 2 || 
|- align="center"
| 5 || October 13 || Dallas || 3 – 2 || Calgary || OT || Kiprusoff || 19,289 || 1–3–1 || 3 || 
|- align="center" bgcolor="#bbffbb" 
| 6 || October 15 || Edmonton || 0 – 3 || Calgary || || Kiprusoff || 19,289 || 2–3–1 || 5 || 
|- align="center" bgcolor="#ffbbbb" 
| 7 || October 17 || Phoenix || 2 – 0 || Calgary || || Kiprusoff || 19,289 || 2–4–1 || 5 || 
|- align="center" bgcolor="#bbffbb"
| 8 || October 20 || Edmonton || 1 – 3 || Calgary || || Kiprusoff || 19,289 || 3–4–1 || 7 || 
|- align="center" bgcolor="#ffbbbb" 
| 9 || October 22 || Calgary || 1 – 2 || Dallas || || Kiprusoff || 18,357 || 3–5–1 || 7 || 
|- align="center" bgcolor="#bbffbb" 
| 10 || October 23 || Calgary || 3 – 2 || Los Angeles || || Kiprusoff || 18,118 || 4–5–1 || 9 || 
|- align="center" bgcolor="#ffbbbb" 
| 11 || October 26 || Calgary || 1 – 4 || Anaheim || || Kiprusoff || 11,774 || 4–6–1 || 9 || 
|- align="center" bgcolor="#ffbbbb" 
| 12 || October 27 || Calgary || 2 – 3 || Phoenix ||  || Sauve || 13,459 || 4–7–1 || 9 || 
|- align="center"
| 13 || October 29 || Calgary || 2 – 3 || San Jose || SO || Kiprusoff || 17,496 || 4–7–2 || 10 || 
|-

|- align="center" bgcolor="#bbffbb" 
| 14 || November 1 || Minnesota || 0 – 3 || Calgary || || Kiprusoff || 19,289 || 5–7–2 || 12 || 
|- align="center" bgcolor="#bbffbb" 
| 15 || November 3 || Columbus || 1 – 2 || Calgary || || Kiprusoff || 19,289 || 6–7–2 || 14 || 
|- align="center" bgcolor="#bbffbb" 
| 16 || November 5 || Vancouver || 0 – 1 || Calgary  || || Kiprusoff || 19,289 || 7–7–2 || 16 || 
|- align="center" bgcolor="#bbffbb" 
| 17 || November 7 || Vancouver || 3 – 4 || Calgary || || Kiprusoff || 19,289 || 8–7–2 || 18 || 
|- align="center" bgcolor="#bbffbb" 
| 18 || November 10 || Calgary || 4 – 3 || Phoenix || || Sauve || 14,493 || 9–7–2 || 20 || 
|- align="center" bgcolor="#bbffbb" 
| 19 || November 12 || Colorado || 3 – 5 || Calgary || || Kiprusoff || 19,289 || 10–7–2 || 22 || 
|- align="center" bgcolor="#bbffbb" 
| 20 || November 14 || Minnesota || 2 – 3 || Calgary || || Kiprusoff || 19,289 || 11–7–2 || 24 || 
|- align="center" bgcolor="#bbffbb" 
| 21 || November 16 || Detroit || 1 – 3 || Calgary || || Kiprusoff || 19,289 || 12–7–2 || 26 || 
|- align="center" bgcolor="#ffbbbb" 
| 22 || November 18 || Chicago || 5 – 2 || Calgary || || Kiprusoff || 19,289 || 12–8–2 || 26 || 
|- align="center" bgcolor="#bbffbb" 
| 23 || November 21 || Calgary || 3 – 2 || Colorado || SO || Sauve || 18,007 || 13–8–2 || 28 || 
|- align="center" bgcolor="#bbffbb" 
| 24 || November 23 || San Jose  || 2 – 3 || Calgary || || Kiprusoff || 19,289 || 14–8–2 || 30 || 
|- align="center"
| 25 || November 25 || Edmonton || 2 – 1 || Calgary || SO || Kiprusoff || 19,289 || 14–8–3 || 31 || 
|- align="center" bgcolor="#ffbbbb" 
| 26 || November 29 || Calgary || 0 – 2 || Nashville || || Kiprusoff || 12,797 || 14–9–3 || 31 || 
|-

|- align="center" bgcolor="#bbffbb" 
| 27 || December 1 || Calgary || 3 – 2 || Detroit || || Kiprusoff || 20,066 || 15–9–3 || 33 || 
|- align="center" bgcolor="#bbffbb" 
| 28 || December 3 || Calgary || 3 – 2 || Pittsburgh || || Kiprusoff || 16,626 || 16–9–3 || 35 || 
|- align="center"
| 29 || December 6 || Calgary || 0 – 1 || Philadelphia || SO || Kiprusoff || 19,542 || 16–9–4 || 36 || 
|- align="center" bgcolor="#bbffbb" 
| 30 || December 7 || Calgary || 4 – 1 || New Jersey || || Sauve || 13,332 || 17–9–4 || 38 || 
|- align="center" bgcolor="#bbffbb" 
| 31 || December 10 || Ottawa || 1 – 2 || Calgary || OT || Kiprusoff || 19,289 || 18–9–4 || 40 || 
|- align="center" bgcolor="#bbffbb" 
| 32 || December 17 || Boston || 0 –  3 || Calgary || || Kiprusoff || 19,289 || 19–9–4 || 42 || 
|- align="center" bgcolor="#ffbbbb" 
| 33 || December 19 || Calgary || 4 – 5 || Edmonton || || Kiprusoff || 16,839 || 19–10–4 || 42 || 
|- align="center" bgcolor="#ffbbbb" 
| 34 || December 21 || Los Angeles || 5 – 2 || Calgary || || Kiprusoff || 19,289 || 19–11–4 || 42 || 
|- align="center" bgcolor="#bbffbb" 
| 35 || December 23 || Calgary || 6 – 5 || Vancouver || SO || Kiprusoff || 18,630 || 20–11–4 || 44 || 
|- align="center" bgcolor="#bbffbb" 
| 36 || December 26 || Calgary || 2 – 1 || Vancouver || || Kiprusoff || 18,630 || 21–11–4 || 46 || 
|- align="center" bgcolor="#ffbbbb" 
| 37 || December 27 || Nashville || 4 – 3 || Calgary || || Sauve || 19,289 || 21–12–4 || 46 || 
|- align="center" bgcolor="#bbffbb" 
| 38 || December 29 || Minnesota || 2 – 4 || Calgary || || Kiprusoff || 19,289 || 22–12–4 || 48 || 
|- align="center" bgcolor="#bbffbb" 
| 39 || December 31 || Edmonton || 5 – 6 || Calgary || || Kiprusoff || 19,289 || 23–12–4 || 50 || 
|-

|- align="center" bgcolor="#bbffbb" 
| 40 || January 2 || Chicago || 2 – 3 || Calgary || || Kiprusoff || 19,289 || 24–12–4 || 52 || 
|- align="center" bgcolor="#bbffbb" 
| 41 || January 6 || Toronto || 0 – 1 || Calgary || || Kiprusoff || 19,289 || 25–12–4 || 54 || 
|- align="center"
| 42 || January 7 || Calgary || 3 – 4 || Vancouver || OT || Kiprusoff || 18,630 || 25–12–5 || 55 || 
|- align="center" bgcolor="#ffbbbb" 
| 43 || January 10 || Calgary || 2 – 4 || NY Rangers || || Kiprusoff || 18,200 || 25–13–5 || 55 || 
|- align="center" bgcolor="#ffbbbb" 
| 44 || January 12 || Calgary || 2 – 3 || NY Islanders || || Kiprusoff || 10,315 || 25–14–5 || 55 || 
|- align="center" bgcolor="#bbffbb" 
| 45 || January 14 || Calgary || 4 – 1 || Minnesota || || Kiprusoff || 18,568 || 26–14–5 || 57 || 
|- align="center" bgcolor="#bbffbb" 
| 46 || January 19 || Montreal || 2 – 3 || Calgary || || Kiprusoff || 19,289 || 27–14–5 || 59 || 
|- align="center" bgcolor="#bbffbb" 
| 47 || January 21 || Buffalo || 1 – 4 || Calgary || || Kiprusoff || 19,289 || 28–14–5 || 61 || 
|- align="center" bgcolor="#bbffbb" 
| 48 || January 23 || Calgary || 3 – 1 || Edmonton || || Kiprusoff || 16,839 || 29–14–5 || 63 || 
|- align="center" bgcolor="#ffbbbb" 
| 49 || January 24 || Calgary || 4 – 7 || Colorado || || Sauve || 18,007 || 29–15–5 || 63 || 
|- align="center" bgcolor="#ffbbbb" 
| 50 || January 26 || Calgary || 0 – 2 || Chicago || || Kiprusoff || 10,486 || 29–16–5 || 63 || 
|- align="center" bgcolor="#bbffbb" 
| 51 || January 29 || Calgary || 5 – 3 || Chicago || || Kiprusoff || 15,748 || 30–16–5 || 65 || 
|- align="center"
| 52 || January 30 || Calgary || 2 – 3 || St. Louis || SO || Kiprusoff || 13,310 || 30–16–6 || 66 || 
|-

|- align="center"
| 53 || February 1 || Columbus || 2 – 1 || Calgary || SO || Kiprusoff || 19,289 || 30–16–7 || 67 || 
|- align="center" bgcolor="#ffbbbb" 
| 54 || February 3 || Vancouver || 3 – 1 || Calgary || || Kiprusoff || 19,289 || 30–17–7 || 67 || 
|- align="center" bgcolor="#bbffbb" 
| 55 || February 6 || Calgary || 4 – 3 || San Jose || || Kiprusoff || 15,242 || 31–17–7 || 69 || 
|- align="center" bgcolor="#bbffbb" 
| 56 || February 8 || Anaheim || 1 – 3 || Calgary || || Kiprusoff || 19,289 || 32–17–7 || 71 || 
|- align="center" bgcolor="#bbffbb" 
| 57 || February 10 || St. Louis || 2 – 3 || Calgary || OT || Boucher || 19,289 || 33–17–7 || 73 || 
|- align="center" bgcolor="#ffbbbb" 
| 58 || February 28 || Vancouver || 2 – 1 || Calgary || || Kiprusoff || 19,289 || 33–18–7 || 73 || 
|-

|- align="center" bgcolor="#bbffbb" 
| 59 || March 2 || St. Louis || 1 – 3 || Calgary || || Kiprusoff || 19,289 || 34–18–7 || 75 || 
|- align="center" bgcolor="#bbffbb"
| 60 || March 4 || San Jose || 0 – 2 || Calgary || || Kiprusoff || 19,289 || 35–18–7 || 77 || 
|- align="center" bgcolor="#ffbbbb" 
| 61 || March 7 || Nashville || 3 – 2 || Calgary || || Kiprusoff || 19,289 || 35–19–7 || 77 || 
|- align="center" bgcolor="#bbffbb" 
| 62 || March 9 || Dallas || 0 – 1 || Calgary || || Kiprusoff || 19,289 || 36–19–7 || 79 || 
|- align="center" bgcolor="#ffbbbb" 
| 63 || March 12 || Calgary || 0 – 3 || Colorado || || Kiprusoff || 18,007 || 36–20–7 || 79 || 
|- align="center" bgcolor="#bbffbb" 
| 64 || March 13 || Colorado || 3 – 4 || Calgary || || Kiprusoff || 19,289 || 37–20–7 || 81 || 
|- align="center"
| 65 || March 16 || Calgary || 2 – 3 || Edmonton || OT || Kiprusoff || 16,839 || 37–20–8 || 82 || 
|- align="center" bgcolor="#ffbbbb" 
| 66 || March 18 || Calgary || 4 – 9 || Nashville || || Boucher || 17,113 || 37–21–8 || 82 || 
|- align="center" bgcolor="#bbffbb" 
| 67 || March 19 || Calgary || 3 – 2 || Minnesota || || Kiprusoff || 18,568 || 38–21–8 || 84 || 
|- align="center" bgcolor="#ffbbbb" 
| 68 || March 21 || Calgary || 1 – 3 || Minnesota || || Kiprusoff || 18,568 || 38–22–8 || 84 || 
|- align="center" bgcolor="#bbffbb" 
| 69 || March 23 || Calgary || 7 – 2 || St. Louis || || Kiprusoff || 14,706 || 39–22–8 || 86 || 
|- align="center" bgcolor="#ffbbbb" 
| 70 || March 24 || Calgary || 2 – 3 || Columbus || || Kiprusoff || 17,041 || 39–23–8 || 86 || 
|- align="center" bgcolor="#ffbbbb" 
| 71 || March 26 || Calgary || 2 – 3 || Dallas || || Kiprusoff || 18,584 || 39–24–8 || 86 || 
|- align="center" bgcolor="#bbffbb" 
| 72 || March 29 || Los Angeles || 1 – 2 || Calgary || || Kiprusoff || 19,289 || 40–24–8 || 88 || 
|- align="center" bgcolor="#bbffbb" 
| 73 || March 31 || Colorado || 3 – 6 || Calgary || || Kiprusoff || 19,289 || 41–24–8 || 90 || 
|-

|- align="center" bgcolor="#bbffbb" 
| 74 || April 1 || Calgary || 4 – 1 || Edmonton || || Kiprusoff || 16,839 || 42–24–8 || 92 || 
|- align="center" 
| 75 || April 3 || Detroit || 2 – 1 || Calgary || SO || Kiprusoff || 19,289 || 42–24–9 || 93 || 
|- align="center" bgcolor="#bbffbb" 
| 76 || April 5 || Phoenix || 2 – 5 || Calgary || || Kiprusoff || 19,289 || 43–24–9 || 95 || 
|- align="center" bgcolor="#bbffbb" 
| 77 || April 7 || Minnesota || 1 – 2 || Calgary || || Kiprusoff || 19,289 || 44–24–9 || 97 || 
|- align="center"
| 78 || April 8 || Calgary || 2 – 3 || Vancouver || OT || Kiprusoff || 18,630 || 44–24–10 || 98 || 
|- align="center" bgcolor="#bbffbb" 
| 79 || April 11 || Anaheim || 0 – 3 || Calgary || || Kiprusoff || 19,289 || 45–24–10 || 100 || 
|- align="center" bgcolor="#bbffbb" 
| 80 || April 13 || Colorado || 0 – 2 || Calgary || || Kiprusoff || 19,289 || 46–24–10 || 102 || 
|- align="center"
| 81 || April 15 || Calgary || 1 – 2 || Los Angeles || SO || Kiprusoff || 18,118 || 46–24–11 || 103 || 
|- align="center" bgcolor="#ffbbbb" 
| 82 || April 17 || Calgary || 3 – 4 || Anaheim || || Boucher || 17,174 || 46–25–11 || 103 || 
|-

|-
| Legend:

Playoffs

|- align="center" bgcolor="#bbffbb" 
| 1 || April 21 || Anaheim || 1 – 2 || Calgary || OT || Kiprusoff || 19,289 || Calgary leads 1–0 || 
|- align="center" bgcolor="#ffbbbb" 
| 2 || April 23 || Anaheim || 4 – 3 || Calgary || || Kiprusoff || 19,289 || Series tied 1–1 || 
|- align="center" bgcolor="#bbffbb" 
| 3 || April 25 || Calgary || 5 – 2 || Anaheim || || Kiprusoff || 17,174 || Calgary leads 2–1 || 
|- align="center" bgcolor="#ffbbbb" 
| 4 || April 27 || Calgary || 2 – 3 || Anaheim || OT || Kiprusoff || 17,174 || Series tied 2–2 || 
|- align="center" bgcolor="#bbffbb" 
| 5 || April 29 || Anaheim || 2 – 3 || Calgary || || Kiprusoff || 19,289 || Calgary leads 3–2 || 
|- align="center" bgcolor="#ffbbbb" 
| 6 || May 1 || Calgary || 1 – 2 || Anaheim || || Kiprusoff || 16,594 || Series tied 3–3 || 
|- align="center" bgcolor="#ffbbbb" 
| 7 || May 3 || Anaheim || 3 – 0 || Calgary || || Kiprusoff || 19,289 || Anaheim wins 4–3 || 
|-

|-
| Legend:

Player statistics

Scoring
 Position abbreviations: C = Centre; D = Defence; G = Goaltender; LW = Left Wing; RW = Right Wing
  = Joined team via a transaction (e.g., trade, waivers, signing) during the season. Stats reflect time with the Flames only.
  = Left team via a transaction (e.g., trade, waivers, release) during the season. Stats reflect time with the Flames only.

Goaltending
  = Joined team via a transaction (e.g., trade, waivers, signing) during the season. Stats reflect time with the Flames only.
  = Left team via a transaction (e.g., trade, waivers, release) during the season. Stats reflect time with the Flames only.
Bold text denotes league record. Italics denotes franchise record.

Awards and records

Awards

Records achieved in the season

Flames team records
Fewest home goals against in one season: (73)–previous record was 85 in the 2003–04 season
Tied record for most shots for in one period: 3rd period, November 14, 2005 against the Minnesota Wild (25)
Longest consecutive shutout minutes, for: April 8, 2006, 2:27 overtime at Vancouver Canucks; April 11 vs. Mighty Ducks of Anaheim to April 15, 3rd period at Los Angeles Kings (161:11)–previous record was 160:07 in the 2000–01 season
Set a new record for fastest goal to start a period when Daymond Langkow scored five seconds into the third period against Anaheim on March 11.

Flames individual records
Most wins in a season: Miikka Kiprusoff (42)–previous record was 39, held by Mike Vernon in the 1987–88 season
Most shutouts in a season: Miikka Kiprusoff (10)–Four Flames were tied with the previous record of 5:  Dan Bouchard, Phil Myre, Fred Brathwaite, & Roman Turek
Most goals, rookie defenceman: Dion Phaneuf (20)–previous record was 18, held by Gary Suter in the 1985–86 season

Milestones

Transactions
The Flames were involved in the following transactions from February 17, 2005, the day after the 2004–05 NHL season was officially cancelled, through June 19, 2006, the day of the deciding game of the 2006 Stanley Cup Finals.

Trades

Players acquired

Players lost

Signings

Draft picks
Calgary's picks at the 2005 NHL Entry Draft.  Due to the cancellation of the 2004–05 NHL season, the 2005 draft order was determined by a random draw, with each team gaining one to three "balls" based on recent performance. Each team started with three balls, and lost one for each time they made the post-season in the previous three years, with a minimum of one ball per team.  The Flames had two balls in the lottery, however were very unlucky, ending up with the 26th overall pick.

Farm teams

Omaha Ak-Sar-Ben Knights
The Flames returned to having their own American Hockey League affiliate in 2005–06 with the debut of the Omaha Ak-Sar-Ben Knights in Omaha, Nebraska. This ended a two-year relationship with the Lowell Lockmonsters, whom the Flames shared the affiliation with the Carolina Hurricanes.  2005–06 marked the first season the Flames had a full affiliate since suspending the Saint John Flames franchise in 2003. The team is co-owned by the Calgary Flames, and the Knights of Ak-Sar-Ben, a philanthropist organization in Omaha.

The Knights had a disappointing inaugural season, finishing sixth in the Western Division, and out of the playoffs, with a record of  35–31–3–11.  Carsen Germyn led the team in goals with 24, while Mark Giordano led in assists, 42, and points, 58.  Brent Krahn led the way in goal with 26 wins, while both he and Curtis McElhinney finished with three shutouts each.

Las Vegas Wranglers
2005–06 marked the third season the ECHL's Las Vegas Wranglers were affiliated with the Flames.  The Wranglers iced a strong team in 2005–06, setting franchise records for wins, 56, goals for, 267, and fewest goals against, 176.  Despite their 56–13–6 record, the Wranglers only finished 2nd in the West Division, one point back of the Alaska Aces.  Their point total of 112 was second best in the league, behind only the Aces.  The Wranglers needed seven games to defeat the Idaho Steelheads in the West Division semi-finals before being knocked out of the playoffs by the eventual Kelly Cup champion Aces in five games.

See also
2005–06 NHL season

Notes

References

Player stats: 2006–07 Calgary Flames Media Guide – 2005–06 stats, pg. 107.
Game log: 2005–06 Calgary Flames game log on espn.com
Team standings: 2006–07 Calgary Flames Media Guide – 2005–06 standings, pg. 146.
Team records: 2006–07 Calgary Flames Media Guide – Flames all time team & individual records, pp. 211–214
Previous team records: 2005–06 Calgary Flames Media Guide – Flames all time team & individual records, pp. 209–212

Calgary Flames seasons
Calgary Flames season, 2005-06
Cal